Novita is a South Australian disability organisation, providing support, services and equipment to children, teens and young adults living with disability, their families and carers. In August 2019, it was announced that scosa was to merge into Novita.

History
The name was changed to Novita Children's Services in 2004.

It originally focused on supporting children with poliomyelitis, expanding to support those with cerebral palsy by 1944, and now works with children with a broad range of needs. With the current emphasis on community based care and deinstitutionalisation, Novita Children's Services stopped providing institutional care at Regency Park in 1993, working with children and families in locally based centres and in community settings. It also provides support under the National Disability Insurance Scheme (NDIS).

Initially relying on public and South Australian Government support the CCA ran the Somerton Crippled Children's Home from 1939, and the Ashford House School, both to 1976. Both accommodation services and the school then moved Regency Park Centre for the Young Disabled.

In 2019, Novita merged with scosa and their headquarters relocated in 2020 to a new facility at Hindmarsh.

People
Russell Ebert
Daphne Lorraine Gum
Roland Ellis Jacobs
Kevin Scarce
Arthur Ernest William Short

References

External links
 

1939 establishments in Australia
Disability organisations based in Australia
Children's charities based in Australia
Non-profit organisations based in South Australia
Organizations established in 1939